Honeymoon Suite is the debut album by Canadian rock band Honeymoon Suite, released in 1984 on Warner Bros. Records. In 1990 it was certified Triple Platinum in Canada (in excess of 300,000 copies sold). All four singles - "New Girl Now", "Burning in Love", "Wave Babies" and "Stay in the Light" - were also certified Gold in Canada.

Track listing 
All songs written by Dermot Grehan, except where noted.
 "New Girl Now" – 3:37
 "Burning in Love" – 4:43
 "Wave Babies" – 4:21
 "Stay in the Light" – 3:52
 "Now That You Got Me" – 3:30
 "Funny Business" – 4:01
 "Heart on Fire" (Eddie Schwartz, Dave Tyson) 3:32
 "Turn My Head" – 3:29
 "It's Your Heart" (Dermot Grehan, Ray Coburn) 3:25
 "Face to Face" – 5:05

Singles
The following singles (together with promotional videos) were released from the album:

Album credits

Personnel
Derry Grehan - lead guitar, vocals
Johnnie Dee - lead vocals, guitar
Brian Brackstone - bass guitar (courtesy of Attic Records)
Ray Coburn - keyboards, vocals
Dave Betts - drums

Band member Gary Lalonde (bass guitar, vocals) is shown in the photograph of the band on the back cover.

Production
Tom Treumuth - producer
Lenny De Rose, Mark Wright - engineers
Joe Primeau, Garth Richardson - assistant engineers
Mixed at the Farmyard Studios, Bucks, England by Stephen W. Tayler
Assisted by Andy Scarth
^Mixed at Electric Lady Studios, N.Y.C. by David Wittman
^Originally mastered at Masterdisk, N.Y.C. by Bob Ludwig

References

 Liner notes from Honeymoon Suite.
 Liner notes from Honeymoon Suite − The Singles.

Honeymoon Suite albums
1984 debut albums
Warner Records albums